Bart Lytton (born Bernard Shulman; October 4, 1912 – June 29, 1969) was an American financier, Democratic Party fundraiser and philanthropist largely remembered for his flamboyance. A self-made man, he was a founder of one of the largest savings and loans in the United States only to lose it all a few years before his death.

Lytton, who contributed significantly to the John F. Kennedy presidential campaign in 1960, was "brash, colorful and controversial" and called himself "the most successful businessman in this decade in the U.S.", declaring "The only ism for me is narcissism".

Early life, writing career, communist dalliance
Lytton was born in New Castle, Pennsylvania, the son of Benjamin Otto Shulman, an emigrant from the Russian Empire, and Ina (née Rabinowitz), who married in 1911. His father was an attorney who was murdered in 1915 in Youngstown, Ohio, where he was shot in the head by an enraged butcher who lost a lawsuit.

When Lytton reached the age of 5, his mother remarried to a respected Russian-born physician in New Castle. He and his younger brother, Yale, were raised, with two stepbrothers, in an upper-middle-class Jewish family.

After graduating from the University of Virginia in 1934, Bernard became a writer in New York City, where he worked as a playwright and briefly joined the Communist Party. In 1940, he moved to Hollywood and, maintaining his Communist connections, wrote magazine articles before breaking into the movie industry, writing scripts or story treatments for four films produced between 1942 and 1945. During this time, he adopted the name Bart, as well as his wife's stepfather's last name, and became Bart Lytton.

Lytton gave up screenwriting at the end of World War II, in part because of disagreements with his former Communist comrades, and, after some years of unemployment, went into business as a mortgage broker, with his aunt who owned a small mortgage company in east Los Angeles. (His aunt, Faye Roberts, founded Lynwood Savings and Loan Association, later changing its name World Savings and Loan Association, later taking World public under the name of Transworld Financial Corporation, which later merged with Golden West Financial Corporation). 

Then he became a home builder and real estate developer, his occupation in 1953, when, at the height of the Cold War, he publicly testified to the House Committee on Un-American Activities about his Communist experiences in New York and Hollywood.

Financial and political rise
Lytton formed his first savings and loan association in California in 1954, but his rapid financial rise began in Las Vegas, Nevada, two years later. By 1958, when he became active in Democratic politics through a connection with Jesse Unruh, the "boss" of the California State Assembly.

A lavish political contributor, Lytton served as Finance Chairman of the California Democratic Party from 1958 to 1962, during the first administration of Governor Pat Brown, and was a major donor to the presidential campaign of President John F. Kennedy.

1960 presidential election
As a delegate to the 1960 Democratic National Convention in Los Angeles, Lytton angered both Kennedy and Governor Brown by his mystifying support of former Connecticut Governor and Ambassador Chester Bowles for the presidency, though Bowles had no other support on the delegation and had publicly endorsed Kennedy. Apart from casting his lone half-vote for Bowles, Lytton not only printed and distributed a Bowles "newsletter" to the delegates, but even tried to "crash" a caucus reserved for delegates committed to Kennedy. Thomas Lynch, the Brown stalwart who chaired the caucus (and later became Attorney General of California), took great satisfaction in having Lytton bodily thrown out of the room.

Bobby Baker, top political aide to Lyndon Johnson when the Texas Senator became Kennedy's vice presidential running-mate, recalled that Lytton gave an astonishing $200,000 in cash to Kennedy a month before the election, probably the largest cash contribution from any individual of the Democratic campaign. All that Lytton asked in return was the prestige of traveling with the candidates, and in the case of Johnson, a Lytton aide even proposed the ideal circumstances: A "whistle-stop" train trip through the South. Baker immediately latched on to the idea and it soon became a reality. Johnson would travel through eight Southern States in early October, with loudspeakers attached to his train blaring out "The Yellow Rose of Texas". The journey of what reporters laughingly called "The Corn Pone Special" won much popular southern support for the Democrats and was widely credited, by both Baker and later historians, with winning the election for Kennedy.

Lytton was aboard the train with Johnson, handing out press releases at each stop, mentioning his presence at the candidate's side. Baker tolerated this as the "typical Hollywood mentality" of a generous "egomaniac". But for Lytton it also proved self-destructive. When the train reached Greenville, South Carolina, Baker received a call from Drew Pearson, the best-known investigative journalist of his day, saying he had information that Lytton, "a Communist", or at least an ex-Communist once blacklisted in Hollywood, was traveling with the Senator. Johnson, who had been unaware of Lytton's cash contribution until Baker informed him and asked for instructions, directed his aide to "get him the hell off of here". Lytton abruptly left the train.

Final years: patron of the arts to financial collapse
Lytton was not generally well liked by the professional politicians with whom he worked, who privately ridiculed his flamboyant personality and "nouveau riche" behavior, but they could not afford to ignore his energetic labors, his large contributions and his substantial wealth. At its height, Lytton's financial empire represented one-fifth of all savings and loan assets in the United States.

Lytton was not only politically influential but also made his mark in the art world. Together with Howard F. Ahmanson, Sr. (the prominent Republican who had reportedly introduced him to Unruh), and Anna Bing Arnold, Lytton was first a principal patron of the Los Angeles County Museum of Art, the largest art museum west of the Mississippi when it opened in 1965. Lytton later withdrew his promised support in disagreement with Museum planners, and a Museum gallery named for him was eventually renamed in honor of oil magnate Armand Hammer. Lytton retaliated by creating his own "Lytton Center for the Visual Arts" in one of his bank buildings, which also housed an invaluable European collection he had purchased for a future Hollywood Film Museum, another of his pet projects that was stillborn.

1965 also marked the beginning of Lytton's financial decline. In 1967, his corporate empire collapsed. He lost much of his personal wealth, and two years later, while planning to begin a new career as a movie producer, he died of a heart attack at age 56 in 1969. His widow later reported to a court that, at his death, he was heavily in debt and virtually insolvent.

A public park he originally built for art displays near one of his office buildings in the city of Palo Alto still bears his name.

References

Additional sources
New Castle (Pennsylvania) News, June 22, 1965 and June 30, 1969 (obituary)
Who Was Who in America, Volume V, 1969–73
Bart Lytton, Oral History, John F. Kennedy Presidential Library, 1966

American real estate businesspeople
1912 births
1969 deaths
Businesspeople from Los Angeles
Philanthropists from California
People associated with the Los Angeles County Museum of Art
20th-century American Jews
People from Lawrence County, Pennsylvania
20th-century American businesspeople
American people of Russian-Jewish descent
American people of Polish-Jewish descent
20th-century American philanthropists